Krafft is a surname of Germanic origin. Notable people with the surname include:

 Adam Krafft (1493–1558)
 Barbara Krafft (1764–1825), Austrian painter
 Charles Wing Krafft (fl. c. 2000), American artist
 David von Krafft (1655-1724), German-Swedish painter
 Friedrich Krafft (1852–1923), German chemist
 Hugues Krafft (1853-1935), French photographer
 Johann Peter Krafft (1780–1856), German painter
 Karl Ernst Krafft (1900–1945), Swiss astrologer
 Katia and Maurice Krafft, French volcanologists
 Laura Krafft, American comedian writer and actress
 Manfred Krafft (1937-2022), German football player and manager
 Per Krafft the Elder (1724-1793), Swedish painter
 Per Krafft the Younger, (1777-1863), Swedish painter
 Vic Krafft (1919–1991), American professional basketball player
 Wilhelmina Krafft, (1778-1828), Swedish painter
 Wolfgang Ludwig Krafft (1743-1814), German astronomer and physicist
 Konrad Krafft von Dellmensingen (1862-1953), German army general in WW1
 Richard von Krafft-Ebing (1840–1902)

See also 
 Kraft (disambiguation)

de:Krafft
fr:Krafft